The Dark Blue was a London-based literary magazine published monthly from 1871 to 1873 and sold for one shilling per issue.

The magazine was founded and edited by John Christian Freund, who was educated at the University of Oxford. The title was based upon a magazine Dark Blue: An Oxford University Magazine, which folded in 1867 after publishing one issue. The Dark Blue was published in London in 1871 by Sampson Low, Son, & Marston and then from 1871 to 1873 by British & Colonial Publishing.

The Dark Blue published essays, stories, poems, and illustrations. Literary contributors of essays or stories included Mathilde Blind, Sidney Colvin, W. Bodham Donne, W.S. Gilbert, G.A. Henty ("A Pipe of Opium"), Thomas Hughes, Andrew Lang and A.C. Swinburne. There were translations, such as The Story of Frithiof the Bold translated from the Icelandic by William Morris and The Story of Europa translated from the Latin of Horace by J.J. Sylvester. The illustrators included Ford Madox Brown, W.J. Hennessy, Cecil Lawson and Simeon Solomon. The contributors of poetry included Alfred Perceval Graves, Theo Marzials, Arthur O'Shaughnessy, William Michael Rossetti and George A. Simcox.

The Dark Blue earned a footnote in the history of vampire fiction by its serial publication of Carmilla by Sheridan Le Fanu.

References

1871 establishments in the United Kingdom
1873 disestablishments in the United Kingdom
Defunct literary magazines published in the United Kingdom
English-language magazines
Magazines published in London
Magazines established in 1871
Magazines disestablished in 1873
Monthly magazines published in the United Kingdom